Sennybridge is a village in the historic county of Brecknockshire, Wales, now within the unitary authority area of Powys, situated some  from Cardiff and  from Swansea. It is in the community of Maescar.

Economy
One of the factors which influenced the growth of Sennybridge was the establishment of the Neath and Brecon Railway which opened a station in the adjoining village of Defynnog in 1867. The promoter and contractor of the railway, John Dickson, also made a start on constructing a railway north from Sennybridge that would have linked the Neath and Brecon Railway to the Central Wales Line at Llangammarch Wells but work was suspended on his bankruptcy in 1867 and never resumed. The partially completed earthworks can still be seen in the countryside north of Sennybridge.

Climate

Landmarks
An extensive area of land to the north of Sennybridge is used by the Ministry of Defence for military training purposes. Sennybridge Camp and Army Field Training Centre, known as SENTA, is one of the major bases for Infantry Warfare Training by the British Army in the UK.

Education
Sennybridge's primary school, which houses a Welsh Language Unit, utilises the old Secondary Modern buildings in the village. Although the school is in Sennybridge, it continued to be named Defynnog Primary School until the 1980s when its name was changed to Sennybridge Primary School.

Notable people
William Rees-Thomas CB FRCP FRSM (1887–1978), a Welsh psychiatrist was born in Senny.
Tom Rees, born in 1895, at Cefnbrynich, near the town, was the first official victim of the "Red Baron"—German flying ace Manfred von Richthofen.
Rhydian Roberts (born 1983), a baritone singer, TV presenter and musical theatre actor; finished second in The X Factor (British series 4).

References

External links 
BBC Mid Wales webguide to Sennybridge
Photos of Sennybridge and surrounding area on geograph.org.uk

Villages in Powys
River Usk
Fforest Fawr